Nesiotica is a genus of moths in the subfamily Arctiinae. It contains the single species Nesiotica cladara, which is found on Norfolk Island.

References

Natural History Museum Lepidoptera generic names catalog

Lithosiini